The Lindesnes Region (or Mandal Region) is the metropolitan region surrounding the town of Mandal in Southern Norway.  The region has no governmental functions, but it encompasses five municipalities in Vest-Agder county, primarily covering two large river valleys: Mandalen and Audnedalen. The region is Norway's southernmost region and it borders the Kristiansand Region to the east and the Lister Region to the west.

Municipalities 
The Lindesnes Region includes the following municipalities:

References 

Regions of Norway
Mandal, Norway
Lindesnes
Marnardal
Audnedal
Åseral